The 2011–12 season was Northampton Town's 115th season of existence and their third competitive season in League Two. Along with competing in League Two, the club also participated in the FA Cup, League Cup and Football League Trophy. The season covered the period from 1 July 2011 to 30 June 2012.

Players

Pre-season

Competitions

League Two

League table

Results summary

League position by match

Matches

FA Cup

Carling Cup

Johnstone's Paint Trophy

Appearances, goals and cards

Transfers

References

Northampton Town F.C. seasons
Northampton Town